The following is a list of museums in Copenhagen, including all of the Region Hovedstaden  (best known in English-speaking countries as the Capital Region of Denmark).

The list

Visitor numbers
Visit Denmark, the national Danish tourist organisation, publishes an annual Attractions List with visitor figures for the fifty most visited attractions in Denmark. According to that, visitor numbers in 2010 for the most visited museums in and around Copenhagen were:

 Copenhagen Zoo, 1,055,593
 Louisiana Museum of Modern Art, 557,803
 Danish National Gallery, 448,342
 National Museum of Denmark, 434,000
 Round Tower, 391,108
 Ny Carlsberg Glyptotek, 355,945
 Open Air Museum, 318,667
 Experimentarium, 285,755
 Rosenborg Castle, 238,278
 Kronborg Castle, 194,704
 Tycho Brahe Planetarium, 179,800
 Carlsberg Visitor Centre, 157,500
 Post & Tele Museum, 152.879
 National Aquarium Denmark, 132,433
 The Cinemateque, 116,992
 Viking Ship Museum, 111,455
 Worker's Museum, 100,883

Note: The list from Visit Denmark does not include museum-like parks such as Copenhagen Botanical Garden or Assistens Cemetery.

See also
 List of museums in Denmark
 List of tourist attractions in Denmark

References

 
Copenhagen
Copenhagen
Museums